The Double Tongue is a novel by William Golding. It was found in draft form after his death and published posthumously.

Golding's final novel tells the story of the Pythia, the priestess of Apollo at Delphi. Arieka prophesies in the shadowy years of the 1st century BC when the Romans were securing their grip on the tribes and cities of Greece. The plain, unloved daughter of a local grandee, she is rescued from the contempt and neglect of her family by her Delphic role.

References

1995 British novels
Novels by William Golding
Classical mythology in popular culture
Novels set in ancient Greece
Faber and Faber books